The Southwestern Buckeye League (SWBL) is an Ohio High School Athletic Association (OHSAA) sports conference made up of schools located in southwestern Ohio, mainly around the greater Dayton and Cincinnati areas. It was established in 1944.

Members

 Brookville, Valley View and Eaton moved to the Buckeye Division in 2021
 Waynesville moved to the Southwestern Division in 2021

Future Members
 Trenton Edgewood (2023)
 Hamilton Ross (2023)

History
''Compiled from the SWBL page at SWBL History

State Titles 
1947-48 Eaton Boys' Basketball

1972-73 Brookville Boys' Track

1985-86 Oakwood Boys' Golf

1994-95 Valley View Football

1996-97 Oakwood Baseball

1996-1997 Valley View Football

1997-98 Valley View Football

2001-02 Eaton Boys' Cross Country

2005-06 Oakwood Girls' Tennis

2009-10 Oakwood Boys' Golf

2010-11 Oakwood Boys' Golf

2012-13 Oakwood Boys' Swimming

2012-13 Oakwood Boys' Golf

2013-14 Oakwood Boys' Swimming

2013-14 Oakwood Boys' Golf

Conference Alignment

1940s
The SWBL was created in 1944 by charter members Vandalia Butler, Tippecanoe, Versailles, and Milton-Union.  
West Carrollton and Eaton joined in 1947.

1950s
The league added Trotwood-Madison and Wilmington in during the 1950-51 school year, after which Versailles left along with Wilmington.
For the 1951-52 school year, the SWBL consisted of: Butler, Eaton, Milton-Union, Tippecanoe, Trotwood-Madison and West Carrollton.
In 1953, Randolph (Northmont) and Oakwood were added to bring the league total up to eight.  Randolph would consolidate into Northmont in 1959, which took their place in the SWBL.
Brookville and Northridge were added in 1958 to make the SWBL a ten-member league.

1970s
After the 1971-72 school year, Eaton left and was replaced by Greenville.
A huge change came in 1975 when Butler, Northmont, Trotwood-Madison and West Carrollton left and were replaced by Bellbrook, Carlisle, Dixie, and Valley View.

1980s
After the 1981-82 school year, Milton-Union and Tippecanoe left with Greenville, who was replaced by the school they had replaced: Eaton.
In 1984, Madison and Preble-Shawnee both joined.

2000s
Milton-Union returned in 2001 with Waynesville and the SWBL split into two six-team divisions.  The Southwestern Division consisted of Bellbrook, Eaton, Milton-Union, Oakwood, Preble-Shawnee, and Valley View; while the Buckeye Division was made up of Brookville, Carlisle, Dixie, Madison, Northridge, and Waynesville.
In 2006, Franklin and Monroe bring the league total up to 14.

2020's
Dixie, Milton-Union, Northridge, and Preble-Shawnee leave the conference by 2021 narrowing down the conference to 10 teams. Valley View, Eaton and Brookville moved to the Buckeye Division and Waynesville moves to the Southwestern Division
Trenton Edgewood and Hamilton Ross joining in 2023.

Former members
 Bradford Railroaders (1941–42)
 Vandalia Butler Aviators (1950–75)
 Tipp City Tippecanoe Red Devils (1944–82)
 Versailles Tigers (1944–51)
 Trotwood Trotwood-Madison Rams (1950–75)
Wilmington Hurricane (1950–51)
 West Carrollton Pirates (1947–75)
 Englewood Randolph Township Bobcats (1953–59, consolidated into Northmont)
 Clayton Northmont Thunderbolts (1959–75)
 Greenville Green Wave (1972–82)
 Camden Preble-Shawnee Arrrows (1984-2021)
 Dayton Northridge Polar Bears (1959-2021)
 West Milton Milton-Union Bulldogs (1944–82, 2001-2021)
 New Lebanon Dixie Greyhounds (1975-2021)

Conference Champions (2020-21)

Football: 
Buckeye: Waynesville

Southwestern: Bellbrook

Boys Soccer: 
Buckeye: Milton-Union, Waynesville

Southwestern: Oakwood

Girls Soccer: 
Buckeye: Waynesville

Southwestern: Monroe

Boys Basketball: 
Buckeye: Preble Shawnee

Southwestern: Franklin

Girls Basketball: 
Buckeye: Madison

Southwestern: Bellbrook

Baseball: 
Buckeye: TBD (2018-19: Waynesville)

Southwestern: TBD (2018-19: Franklin, Valley View)

Softball: 
Buckeye: TBD (2018-19: Madison)

Southwestern: TBD (2018-19: Monroe)

References
 Southwestern Buckeye League home

Ohio high school sports conferences